In mathematics (including combinatorics, linear algebra, and dynamical systems), a linear recurrence with constant coefficients (also known as a linear recurrence relation or linear difference equation) sets equal to 0 a polynomial that is linear in the various iterates of a variable—that is, in the values of the elements of a sequence. The polynomial's linearity means that each of its terms has degree 0 or 1.

The equation or its variable is said to be stable if from any set of initial conditions the variable's limit as time goes to infinity exists; this limit is called the steady state.

Difference equations are used in a variety of contexts, such as in economics to model the evolution through time of variables such as gross domestic product, the inflation rate, the exchange rate, etc. They are used in modeling such time series because values of these variables are only measured at discrete intervals. In econometric applications, linear difference equations are modeled with stochastic terms in the form of autoregressive (AR) models and in models such as vector autoregression (VAR) and autoregressive moving average (ARMA) models that combine AR with other features.

Definitions

A linear recurrence with constant coefficients is an equation of the following form, written in terms of parameters  and :

or equivalently as

The positive integer  is called the order of the recurrence and denotes the longest time lag between iterates. The equation is called homogeneous if  and nonhomogeneous if .

If the equation is homogeneous, the coefficients determine the characteristic polynomial (also "auxiliary polynomial" or "companion polynomial")

whose roots play a crucial role in finding and understanding the sequences satisfying the recurrence.

Conversion to homogeneous form

If , the equation

is said to be nonhomogeneous. To solve this equation it is convenient to convert it to homogeneous form, with no constant term. This is done by first finding the equation's steady state value—a value  such that, if  successive iterates all had this value, so would all future values.

assuming the denominator is not 0. If it is zero, the steady state does not exist.

Given the steady state, the difference equation can be rewritten in terms of deviations of the iterates from the steady state, as

which has no constant term, and which can be written more succinctly as

where  equals . This is the homogeneous form.

If there is no steady state, the difference equation

can be combined with its equivalent form

to obtain (by solving both for )

in which like terms can be combined to give a homogeneous equation of one order higher than the original.

Solution example for small orders

The roots of the characteristic polynomial play a crucial role in finding and understanding the sequences satisfying the recurrence. If there are  distinct roots   then each solution to the recurrence takes the form

where the coefficients  are determined in order to fit the initial conditions of the recurrence.

Order 1

For order 1, the recurrence

The  characteristic polynomial equated to zero (the characteristic equation) is simply .

Order 2

Solutions to such recurrence relations of higher order are found by systematic means, often using the fact that  is a solution for the recurrence exactly when  is a root of the characteristic polynomial. This can be approached directly or using generating functions (formal power series) or matrices.

Consider, for example, a recurrence relation of the form

When does it have a solution of the same general form as ? Substituting this guess (ansatz) in the recurrence relation, we find that

must be true for all .

which is the characteristic equation of the recurrence relation. Different solutions are obtained depending on the nature of the roots:  If these roots are distinct, we have the general solution

while if they are identical (when ), we have

In the case of complex eigenvalues (which also gives rise to complex values for the solution parameters  and ), the use of complex numbers can be eliminated by rewriting the solution in trigonometric form.  In this case we can write the eigenvalues as  Then it can be shown that

can be rewritten as

where

Using 

one may simplify the solution given above as

In all cases—real distinct eigenvalues, real duplicated eigenvalues, and complex conjugate eigenvalues—the equation is stable (that is, the variable  converges to a fixed value [specifically, zero]) if and only if both eigenvalues are smaller than one in absolute value.

General solution

Characteristic polynomial and roots
Solving the homogeneous equation

involves first solving its characteristic polynomial

for its characteristic roots . These roots can be solved for algebraically if , but not necessarily otherwise. If the solution is to be used numerically, all the roots of this characteristic equation can be found by numerical methods. However, for use in a theoretical context it may be that the only information required about the roots is whether any of them are greater than or equal to 1 in absolute value.

It may be that all the roots are real or instead there may be some that are complex numbers. In the latter case, all the complex roots come in complex conjugate pairs.

Solution with distinct characteristic roots
If all the characteristic roots are distinct, the solution of the homogeneous linear recurrence

can be written in terms of the characteristic roots as

where the coefficients  can be found by invoking the initial conditions. If all characteristic roots are real, then all the coefficient values  will also be real; but with non-real complex roots, in general some of these coefficients will also be non-real.

Converting complex solution to trigonometric form

If there are complex roots, they come in conjugate pairs and so do the complex terms in the solution equation.

Then the two complex terms in the solution equation can be written as

Using this in the last equation gives this expression for the two complex terms in the solution equation:

which can also be written as

Cyclicity
Depending on the initial conditions, even with all roots real the iterates can experience a transitory tendency to go above and below the steady state value. But true cyclicity involves a permanent tendency to fluctuate, and this occurs if there is at least one pair of complex conjugate characteristic roots.

Solution with duplicate characteristic roots

Solution by conversion to matrix form
An alternative solution method involves converting the th order difference equation to a first-order matrix difference equation. Then the original single th-order equation

can be replaced by the following  first-order equations:

Defining the vector  as

this can be put in matrix form as

This matrix equation can be solved using the methods in the article Matrix difference equation.
In the homogeneous case  is a para-permanent of a lower triangular matrix

Solution using generating functions

The recurrence

can be solved using the theory of generating functions. First, we write . The recurrence is then equivalent to the following generating function equation:

where  is a polynomial of degree at most  correcting the initial terms.
From this equation we can solve to get

In other words, not worrying about the exact coefficients,  can be expressed as a rational function 

The closed form can then be derived via partial fraction decomposition. Specifically, if the generating function is written as

then the polynomial  determines the initial set of corrections , the denominator  determines the exponential term , and the degree  together with the numerator  determine the polynomial coefficient .

Relation to solution to differential equations

The method for solving linear differential equations is similar to the method above—the "intelligent guess" (ansatz) for linear differential equations with constant coefficients is  where  is a complex number that is determined by substituting the guess into the differential equation.

This is not a coincidence.  Considering the Taylor series of the solution to a linear differential equation:

it can be seen that the coefficients of the series are given by the -th derivative of  evaluated at the point . The differential equation provides a linear difference equation relating these coefficients.

This equivalence can be used to quickly solve for the recurrence relationship for the coefficients in the power series solution of a linear differential equation.

The rule of thumb (for equations in which the polynomial multiplying the first term is non-zero at zero) is that:

and more generally

Example: The recurrence relationship for the Taylor series coefficients of the equation:

is given by

or

This example shows how problems generally solved using the power series solution method taught in normal differential equation classes can be solved in a much easier way.

Example: The differential equation

has solution

The conversion of the differential equation to a difference equation of the Taylor coefficients is

Solving with z-transforms
Certain difference equations - in particular, linear constant coefficient difference equations - can be solved using z-transforms. The z-transforms are a class of integral transforms that lead to more convenient algebraic manipulations and more straightforward solutions. There are cases in which obtaining a direct solution would be all but impossible, yet solving the problem via a thoughtfully chosen integral transform is straightforward.

Stability
In the solution equation

a term with real characteristic roots converges to 0 as  grows indefinitely large if the absolute value of the characteristic root is less than 1. If the absolute value equals 1, the term will stay constant as  grows if the root is +1 but will fluctuate between two values if the root is −1. If the absolute value of the root is greater than 1 the term will become larger and larger over time. A pair of terms with complex conjugate characteristic roots will converge to 0 with dampening fluctuations if the absolute value of the modulus  of the roots is less than 1; if the modulus equals 1 then constant amplitude fluctuations in the combined terms will persist; and if the modulus is greater than 1, the combined terms will show fluctuations of ever-increasing magnitude.

Thus the evolving variable  will converge to 0 if all of the characteristic roots have magnitude less than 1. 

If the largest root has absolute value 1, neither convergence to 0 nor divergence to infinity will occur. If all roots with magnitude 1 are real and positive,  will converge to the sum of their constant terms ; unlike in the stable case, this converged value depends on the initial conditions; different starting points lead to different points in the long run. If any root is −1, its term will contribute permanent fluctuations between two values. If any of the unit-magnitude roots are complex then constant-amplitude fluctuations of  will persist. 

Finally, if any characteristic root has magnitude greater than 1, then  will diverge to infinity as time goes to infinity, or will fluctuate between increasingly large positive and negative values.

A theorem of Issai Schur states that all roots have magnitude less than 1 (the stable case) if and only if a particular string of determinants are all positive.

If a non-homogeneous linear difference equation has been converted to homogeneous form which has been analyzed as above, then the stability and cyclicality properties of the original non-homogeneous equation will be the same as those of the derived homogeneous form, with convergence in the stable case being to the steady-state value  instead of to 0.

See also
Recurrence relation
Linear differential equation
Skolem–Mahler–Lech theorem
Skolem problem

References

Combinatorics
Dynamical systems
Linear algebra
Recurrence relations